Bahariasaurus (meaning "Bahariya lizard") is an enigmatic genus of large theropod dinosaur. Bahariasaurus is known to have included at least 1 species, Bahariasaurus ingens, which was found in North African rock layers dating to the Cenomanian and Turonian ages of the Late Cretaceous. The only fossils confidently assigned to Bahariasaurus were found in the Bahariya Formation of the Bahariya (Arabic: الواحة البحرية meaning the "northern oasis") oasis in Egypt by Ernst Stromer but were destroyed during a World War II bombing raid with the same raid taking out the holotype of Spinosaurus and Aegyptosaurus among other animals found in the Bahariya Formation. While there have been more fossils assigned to the genus such as some from the Farak Formation of Niger, these remains are referred to with much less certainty. Bahariasaurus is, by most estimations, one of the largest theropods, approaching the height and length of other large bodied theropods such as Tyrannosaurus rex and the contemporaneous Carcharodontosaurus. The aforementioned estimations tend to put it at around 11–12 metres (36–39 ft) in length and 4 tonnes in overall weight.

History 
Bahariasaurus was found during the 1910s during an expedition to Egypt's Baharija Formation led by Markgraf and Stromer, and the holotype was discovered in 1911. The type species, B. ingens, was described by Ernst Stromer in 1934. This specimen was destroyed in an air raid during World War II on the night of 23/24 April 1944. 

The questionable remains of Bahariasaurus from the Farak Formation of Niger, which consist of a proximal caudal centrum (65 mm), two mid caudal centra and three mid caudal centra (from different individuals) were discovered some time later during the 20th century and described by de Lapparent in 1960. It is possible that these remains may have belonged to another unrelated theropod.

Description 

Bahariasaurus was quite a large theropod. The type species, B. ingens, is only known from post-cranial material. The two centra of the posterior dorsal vertebrae are ~157% and 189% longer than they are tall, and ~82% and ~95% wider than they are tall.  All preserved sacrals have a longitudinally elongate pleurocoel and a ventral median groove. The last sacral vertebrae known from Bahariasaurus implies that there was no greater fusion of the vertebrae after that.

Classification 
The exact taxonomic placement of Bahariasaurus is uncertain, although it has been variously assigned to several theropod groups, including the Carcharodontosauridae and the superfamily Tyrannosauroidea. The smaller contemporaneous theropod Deltadromeus could potentially be synonymous with Bahariasaurus. If this assumption is correct, Bahariasaurus  would possibly represent the largest ceratosaur as recent studies consider Deltadromeus a ceratosaur, specifically a noasaurid. More specimens (especially the skull) would be needed to more accurately classify it and determine its relationship to Deltadromeus. 

In the 2016 description and analysis of the megaraptoran Aoniraptor, Bahariasaurus was found, along with Gualicho, Aoniraptor and Deltadromeus to probably form a family in the still poorly understood clade known as the Megaraptora and are different from the more derived  megaraptorids.

In 2016, Gregory S. Paul suggested that Deltadromeus may be a juvenile specimen of Bahariasaurus, but that their relationship is uncertain and to be determined. A 2020 study found that a referred fossil of Bahariasaurus belongs to Deltadromeus, leaving Bahariasaurus to be regarded as a nomen dubium by the authors.

Paleobiology 

Bahariasaurus was one of four giant theropods known from the Bahariya Formation, the other three being the allosauroid Carcharodontosaurus and the spinosaurids Spinosaurus and Sigilmassasaurus, though the validity of Sigilmassasaurus is currently being debated as it may be a junior synonym of Spinosaurus. It is likely the predators in the Bahariya Formation exhibited niche-partitioning in order to avoid competition so that they could coexist in the same environment.

References 

Megaraptorans
Late Cretaceous dinosaurs of Africa
Cenomanian life
Fossils of Egypt
 
Cretaceous Niger
Fossils of Niger
Fossil taxa described in 1934
Taxa named by Ernst Stromer
Nomina dubia